CYFH may refer to:
 Can You Forgive Her?, an 1865 novel by Anthony Trollope
 "Can You Forgive Her?" (song), a 1993 song by Pet Shop Boys
 Fort Hope Airport, airport in Ontario, Canada